Newton Fork is a stream in the U.S. state of South Dakota.

Some say Newton Fork has the name of a state geologist who explored the area, while others believe a prospector gave the creek his name.

References

See also
List of rivers of South Dakota

Rivers of Pennington County, South Dakota
Rivers of South Dakota